Leonid Zaslavsky (born 26 November 1969) is an Australian wrestler. He competed in the men's freestyle 62 kg at the 1996 Summer Olympics.

References

External links
 

1969 births
Living people
Australian male sport wrestlers
Olympic wrestlers of Australia
Wrestlers at the 1996 Summer Olympics
Sportspeople from Odesa